The List of Living National Treasures of Japan (performing arts) contains all the individuals and groups certified as Living National Treasures by the Ministry of Education, Culture, Sports, Science and Technology of the government of Japan in the category of the .

The performing arts are divided into eight categories: Gagaku, Noh, Bunraku, Kabuki, Kumi Odori, Music, Dance, and Drama. The categories are subdivided into a number of subcategories, usually by role or instrument.

Those working in the performing arts are eligible for recognition either individually (Individual Certification) or as part of a group (General Certification).

List of current designated individuals (performing arts)

Noh

Bunraku

Kabuki

Kumi Odori

Music

Dance

Drama

List of past designated individuals (performing arts)

Noh

Bunraku

Kabuki

Kumi Odori

Music

Dance

Drama

List of designated groups (performing arts)

See also
Living National Treasures of Japan
List of Living National Treasures of Japan (crafts)
List of National Treasures of Japan

References

External links
Kodansha,  
Ministry of Cultural Affairs – Important Intangible Cultural Properties Database 
'人間国宝、河東節三味線の山彦千子さんら３人認定へ,' Asahi Shimbun, 17 July 2009 
'重要無形文化財の保持者の認定について,' Ministry of Cultural Affairs, 15 July 2011